is a former Japanese football player.

Playing career
Ono was born in Funabashi on March 29, 1965. After graduating from Narashino High School, he joined Japan Soccer League side Sumitomo Metal (later Kashima Antlers) in 1983. He played as center back and the club won the 2nd place in 1987 JSL Cup. In 1992, Japan Soccer League was folded and founded new league J1 League. In first season in 1993, the club won the 2nd place J1 League and he was selected Best Eleven. The club also won the 2nd place 1993 Emperor's Cup. However his opportunity to play decreased in 1995 and he moved to Kyoto Purple Sanga in 1996. He retired end of 1996 season.

After retirement
After his playing career, Ono became the owner of an izakaya (Japanese pub). He now works as a soccer commentator and personality on a local radio station, and Director of the Kashima Heights Sports Plaza.

Club statistics

Personal honors
J.League Best XI - 1993

Team honors
Sumitomo Metal/Kashima Antlers
Japan Soccer League Division 2 - 1984, 1986/87

References

External links

1965 births
Living people
Association football people from Chiba Prefecture
Japanese footballers
Japan Soccer League players
J1 League players
Kashima Antlers players
Kyoto Sanga FC players
Association football defenders
People from Funabashi